Chloe O'Brien (born 22 August 1997) is an Australian soccer player, who last played for Newcastle Jets in the Australian W-League.

Playing career

Western Sydney Wanderers 
O'Brien signed with Western Sydney Wanderers in 2015. During the 2014–15 W-League season, she made four appearances. The team finished the regular season in eighth place with a  record. During the 2015–16 W-League, she made 12 appearances and scored an equaliser during the team's 2–1 win over Newcastle Jets on 6 November 2015.

Manly United

Newcastle Jets 
O'Brien returned to the W-League in December 2020, joining Newcastle Jets She departed Newcastle Jets ahead of the 2021–22 A-League Women season.

International 
O'Brien has represented Australia on the under-20 national team. During the 2015 AFC U-19 Women's Championship, she scored a stoppage time goal during the team's 2–0 win over Uzbekistan. Australia finished in third place during the group stage of the tournament.

See also

References

Further reading
 Grainey, Timothy (2012), Beyond Bend It Like Beckham: The Global Phenomenon of Women's Soccer, University of Nebraska Press, 
 Stewart, Barbara (2012), Women's Soccer: The Passionate Game, Greystone Books,

External links
 Western Sydney Wanderers player profile

1997 births
Living people
Australian women's soccer players
Women's association football midfielders
Western Sydney Wanderers FC (A-League Women) players
Newcastle Jets FC (A-League Women) players
A-League Women players